Chenar (also Romanized as Chenār) is a village in Sahrarud Rural District, in the Central District of Fasa County, Fars Province, Iran. At the 2006 census, its population was 178, in 37 families.

References 

Populated places in Fasa County